Pasir Raja is a mukim in Dungun District, Terengganu, Malaysia. Located about 10 km from Bandar Al-Muktafi Billah Shah.

Tourist attractions
Cemerong waterfall

References

Dungun District
Mukims of Terengganu